Summerhill is a neighborhood directly south of Downtown Atlanta between the Atlanta Zoo and Center Parc Stadium. It is bordered by the neighborhoods of Grant Park, Mechanicsville, and Peoplestown.  Established in 1865, Summerhill is one of Atlanta’s oldest neighborhoods and part of the 26 neighborhoods making up the Atlanta Neighborhood Planning Unit system.

History
One of two settlements established after the Civil War by William Jennings in 1865, Summerhill's early inhabitants were freed slaves and Jewish immigrants.  In 1911, two-thirds of Atlanta's Jewish residents lived in Summerhill.  Wood's Chapel and Clarke's Chapel began offering worship services in 1866 within close proximity of each other. Wood's Chapel subsequently became Allen Temple AME.  Clarke's Chapel's congregation was mixed and sought to also promote education which it accomplished by holding the first classes of Clark College and Gammon Theological Seminary in its basement.  Clarke's Chapel was ultimately renamed the Lloyd Street Church.

In 1867 Frederick Ayer founded his school at Richardson and Martin Streets.  The Atlanta Board of Education bought it three years later, making it the only public school for Black children in the City. The school was eventually renamed the E. P. Johnson Elementary School. By 1965, Summerhill grew westward after absorbing the former neighborhood of Washington–Rawson due to its homes being razed to make room for Atlanta–Fulton County Stadium and its parking lots.

In 1966 there was a four-day riot in Summerhill which the Student Nonviolent Coordinating Committee (SNCC) and its leader Stokely Carmichael were accused of inciting following an incident of police brutality. The riots resulted in one death and twenty injuries, and revealed the frustrations still present in lower-income black communities despite two decades of growing black political influence. Mayor Ivan Allen, Jr. went to the area during the riot, pleaded with rioters, and worked with police and local black leaders to restore order in the area.

During the 1996 Summer Olympic Games, Summerhill was the site of the opening and closing ceremonies and track and field events at the Centennial Olympic Stadium. After the Olympics, the stadium was converted to Turner Field where the Atlanta Braves played through the end of the 2016 season. Turner Field and its adjacent parking lots were acquired by Georgia State University in January 2017, and the former ballpark was renovated into Georgia State Stadium, since renamed Center Parc Stadium, for the Panthers football team. The Georgia State Convocation Center is also based in Summerhill which is home to the Georgia State men's and women's basketball teams. The first Atlanta Braves stadium, Atlanta–Fulton County Stadium located next door, was their home when the team first moved to Atlanta in 1966 until its demolition after the 1997 season.

Since 1996, the neighborhood has been the site of rapid development.  It is profiled as a case in urban development in Alexander von Hoffman's House by House, Block by Block: The Rebirth of America's Urban Neighborhoods.  Summerhill is now viewed as one of the most up and coming areas in downtown Atlanta.  Home values have continued to rise and more and more upper-middle-class families are calling Summerhill home. Since 2017, Georgia State is redeveloping Turner Field's parking lots into new mixed developments.

Notable people
Leo Frank lived there
 Boxer Evander Holyfield grew up in Summerhill
 Young Dro
 Ciara
 YFN Lucci
 Herman Jerome Russell

References

External links

Neighborhood Associations
Organized Neighbors of Summerhill
Summerhill Neighborhood Development Corporation
 (Atlanta, Ga.) Photos of Summerhill riot (1966), Atlanta History Center

Maps
Summerhill Neighborhood Map & Boundaries

Neighborhoods in Atlanta